Maly Urala is a rural locality (a selo) in Tlogobsky Selsoviet, Gunibsky District, Republic of Dagestan, Russia. The population was 55 as of 2010.

Geography 
Maly Urala is located 44 km northwest of Gunib (the district's administrative centre) by road, on the Kunada River. Urala and Bolshoy Urala are the nearest rural localities.

References 

Rural localities in Gunibsky District